In rail transport, guard rails or check rails are rails used in the construction of the track, placed parallel to regular running rail to keep the wheels of rolling stock in alignment to prevent derailment. They are generally used along areas of restricted clearance, such as a bridge, trestle, tunnel, or level crossing. They also help to minimize damage to the structure and allow easier post-accident cleanup.

History 

Applications

Bridges 

Guard rails are an essential component of railroad bridges. Their presence prevents a derailed train from striking and damaging bridge components, or deviating from the track enough to leave the tracks entirely and roll over or fall.

Sharp curves 
On sharp curves, guard rails may be placed inside the inner rail, where they engage the back of the flange of the wheel on that side.

Switches 

Guard rails may be incorporated in switches, where they serve to prevent derailments caused by a train's wheels passing through the wrong side of the frog (the point where the straight and diverging rails cross). Guard rails in this case are typically bolted to the traffic rails on each end, with a clamp placed towards the center to prevent movement.

See also 
 Guide bar
 Guide rail

References

External links 
 

Permanent way
Railway safety